Karan Singh Grover (born 23 February 1982) is an Indian model and actor known for his work in Indian television series such as Dill Mill Gayye and Qubool Hai. He has also starred in Bollywood films like Alone and Hate Story 3. In 2019, Grover made a comeback to television with Kasautii Zindagii Kay 2 as Mr. Rishabh Bajaj. In 2019, Grover also made his digital debut with BOSS: Baap of Special Services. In 2020, he appeared in the action-thriller web series Dangerous. In 2021, he appeared in the web series Qubool Hai 2.0, the reboot of Qubool Hai.

Early life
Grover was born on 23 February 1982 in New Delhi, India to a Punjabi Sikh family. He has a younger brother. When Grover was young, his family moved to Al Khobar, Saudi Arabia. He did his schooling in Dammam, Saudi Arabia, and pursued a degree in Hotel Management from IHM Mumbai. He then worked as a Marketing Executive in the Sheraton Hotel in Oman.

Career
In 2004, Grover participated in the Gladrags Manhunt Contest and won the award for the "Most Popular Model." Also in 2004, he began his television career with Balaji Telefilms' youth show Kitni Mast Hai Zindagi on MTV India, for which he was chosen after a nationwide talent hunt conducted by the production house.

In 2007, Grover starred in the show Dill Mill Gayye, a medical youth drama. The Times of India reported that Grover became an "instant hit" and a "teenage icon" due to the show, and that the show became the no.1 show on STAR One. Whilst shooting for Dill Mill Gayye, Grover also participated in a few reality shows and was also seen in several advertisements.

Two years later, Cinevistaas Limited stated that they had lodged a complaint against Grover for routinely reporting hours late for work, which made them incur a loss. Grover left the show for a while, but returned after 6 months due to fan demands. The show ended on 29 October 2010. After Dill Mill Gayye, Grover did two shows with Cinevistaas Limited. He featured in their telefilm Teri Meri Love Stories, and made a cameo appearance in Dil Dosti Dance.

On 29 October 2012, Grover returned to daily fiction with 4 Lions Films' Qubool Hai. The show gained popularity quite early, becoming the number 2 show of Indian Television. The Times of India gave Grover the credit for the high television ratings of the show. Grover won two Best Actor Popular Awards for his portrayal of Asad Ahmed Khan in the show. In 2013, Grover was described as one of the highest paid Indian Television Actors.

Grover's work at Qubool Hai ended at the end of 2013. The channel, Zee TV, said that it had fired him because of his unprofessional behaviour. He denied the allegations, saying that the channel was trying to defame him, and stated that he left because his contract ended and due to ill health. Grover's exit caused a sizeable drop in the ratings of the show.

In 2015, Grover featured in the films Alone and Hate Story 3. Hate Story 3 became a box office success. The International Business Times reviewed Hate Story 3 and wrote "Audiences say Karan Singh Grover steals the show." 

In August 2019, Grover made his digital debut in Alt Balaji's web series BOSS: Baap of Special Services. In June 2019, Grover made a comeback to television after six years with Kasautii Zindagii Kay as Mr. Rishabh Bajaj. This made Grover the highest paid TV actor, as he charged 3 lakhs per day. In October, Grover quit the show, and fans requested him to make a comeback. He returned to the show four months later. Later, he quit the show again.

In 2020, due to COVID-19 pandemic Grover's show Qubool Hai repeated on prime time TV. Also in 2020, Grover starred opposite his wife Bipasha Basu for the second time in crime drama web series Dangerous.

In 2021, Grover starred in the  web series Qubool Hai 2.0, which is a reboot of the 2012 Zee TV soap opera Qubool Hai.

Grover has also signed the projects 3 Dev. Grover will also soon star in Siddharth Anand's action film Fighter which is set to release in 2024.

Personal life 

Grover married actress Shraddha Nigam on 2 December 2008. They divorced after 10 months. He married Jennifer Winget on 9 April 2012. The couple separated in 2014. Grover married actress Bipasha Basu on 30 April 2016. In August 2022, Basu confirmed she was expecting her first child with Grover. On 12 November 2022, Grover and Basu's daughter, Devi Basu Singh Grover was born.

Filmography

Films

Television

Web series

Accolades

See also 
 List of Indian television actors
 List of Indian film actors

References

External links

 
 

21st-century Indian male actors
Indian male film actors
Indian male television actors
Indian male models
Male actors in Hindi cinema
Indian television presenters
Living people
People from New Delhi
Punjabi people
Indian Sikhs
Fear Factor: Khatron Ke Khiladi participants
1982 births